The Adventurous Bachelor is a 1946 Czech comedy film directed by Otakar Vávra. It was entered into the 1946 Cannes Film Festival.

Cast
 Zdeněk Štěpánek – Jan, bakalář
 Vlasta Matulová – Anna, hostinská U Strípku
 Otomar Korbelář – Mikuláš, řezník
 František Smolík – Smardoch, konsel
 Jaroslav Marvan – Písecký, primas města Rakovníka
 František Kreuzmann – Zlutický, inspektor a městský písař
 Jaromíra Pacová – Markyta, Zlutický's Wife (as Míla Pacová)
 Saša Rašilov – Hruška, pekař a konsel
 František Roland – Slach, konsel
 Jaroslav Vojta – Matěj, vysloužilec
 Antonín Šolc – Ondřej Kralovic, kantor
 Josef Gruss – Zachariáš, sukcentor
 Zdeňka Baldová – Slachova žena
 Milada Smolíková – Hrušková, mestka
 Gustav Hilmar – Simon Cerasýn, děkan

References

External links
 

1946 films
Czechoslovak comedy films
1940s Czech-language films
1946 comedy films
Czech black-and-white films
Czechoslovak black-and-white films
Films directed by Otakar Vávra